NA-167 Bahawalpur-IV is a constituency for the National Assembly of Pakistan.

Members of Parliament

2018-2022: NA-173 Bahawalpur-IV

Election 2002 

General elections were held on 10 Oct 2002. Aamir Yar Malik  of PPP won by 80,902 votes.

Election 2008 

General elections were held on 18 Feb 2008. Malik Aamir Yar Waran an Independent candidate won by 59,277 votes.

Election 2013 

General elections were held on 11 May 2013. Mian Najeebuddin Awaisi of PML-N won by 94,429 votes and became the  member of National Assembly.

Election 2018 

General elections were held on 25 July 2018.

See also
NA-166 Bahawalpur-III
NA-168 Bahawalpur-V

References

External links 
Election result's official website

NA-184